Wildest Dreams is a 1991 play by British playwright Alan Ayckbourn.

Plays by Alan Ayckbourn
1991 plays